Post to Wire is the debut album of Heather Duby, released on October 19, 1999 through Sub Pop.

Track listing

Personnel 
Musicians
Eric Akre – percussion
Heather Duby – vocals, production
Bo Gilliland – bass guitar
Michael Shilling – drums
Gary Thorstensen – guitar
Production and additional personnel
Steve Fisk – engineering, production
John Golden – mastering
Sam Hofstedt – engineering

References 

1999 debut albums
Albums produced by Steve Fisk
Heather Duby albums
Sub Pop albums